The West Bend station, otherwise known as the West Bend Chicago and North Western Depot is a historic railroad station in West Bend, Wisconsin. The depot was designed in 1900 by the firm Frost and Granger in the Craftsman style for the Chicago and North Western Railway (C&NW). It is a variation
of the C&NW "Number One" combination depot design. Passenger service to the depot ended in 1971, with the creation of Amtrak.

The depot was added to the National Register of Historic Places on August 19, 2008.

References
 Miller, Elizabeth L. West Bend Chicago and North Western Depot National Register of Historic Places Inventory-Nomination Form, 2007. On file at the National Park Service.

Railway stations on the National Register of Historic Places in Wisconsin
Railway stations in the United States opened in 1900
Former Chicago and North Western Railway stations
National Register of Historic Places in Washington County, Wisconsin
Former railway stations in Wisconsin